Thron X. Riggs (April 25, 1921 – November 2015) was an American football tackle who played one season with the Boston Yanks. He played college football at the University of Washington, having previously attended Buckley High School in Buckley, Washington. He later worked in the oil business and was a general manager of the Chevron Pascagoula Refinery. He was also a World War II veteran, having served with the United States Marine Corps.  He died in November 2015.

References

1921 births
2015 deaths
American football tackles
Boston Yanks players
Washington Huskies football players
Players of American football from Washington (state)
People from Buckley, Washington
United States Marine Corps personnel of World War II